Michael J. Anderson (born October 31, 1953) is a retired American actor known for his roles as The Man from Another Place in David Lynch's television series Twin Peaks, the prequel film for the series, Twin Peaks: Fire Walk with Me, and as Samson Leonhart on the HBO series Carnivàle.

Early life and career

Prior to his acting career, Anderson worked as a computer technician for Martin Marietta. He was part of the ground support system for NASA's Space Shuttle. He appeared as himself in a 1984 documentary called Little Mike: A Videoportrait of Michael Anderson.

Acting career 
Anderson appeared in four episodes of Twin Peaks. The Man from Another Place is attired in a red suit and speaks in an unusual manner. Anderson used phonetically reversed speaking as a secret language with his junior high school friends and then played a character in Twin Peaks where he used the same method of speaking, which was recorded and played backwards. Anderson then synced his lips to the reversed recording for film. He first appears in Special Agent Dale Cooper's cryptic dream about the murder of Laura Palmer, set in a red room. Anderson  also appears as the  Man from Another Place in Twin Peaks: Fire Walk with Me, the prequel to Twin Peaks.

Anderson portrayed a man of average height in Lynch's Mulholland Drive, using a prosthetic body. From 2003 to 2005, Anderson was a cast member of the TV series Carnivàle.

In 2015 Anderson was asked to reprise his role as The Man from Another Place for [[Twin Peaks (season 3)|Twin Peaks''' third season]] but declined. His character instead appears as a treelike computer-generated effect and is voiced by an uncredited actor. When asked who provided the voice for the CGI character, executive producer Sabrina Sutherland replied, "Unfortunately, I think this question should remain a mystery and not be answered." Anderson has since retired from the acting industry.

 Controversies 

In August 2016, Anderson went on a rant on his Facebook page, writing, "He totally did NOT rape his own underage daughter and then write a television series about it. She totally has NOT lived under a DEATH THREAT from her own father, all her life if she ever told. He NEVER had his ‘best friend’ murdered. And he DEFINITELY NEVER suggested to me that I should kill myself! There’s a whole bunch of other stuff he never did either."

While Anderson did not mention the subject of his tirade, he appeared to be making uncorroborated accusations against David Lynch. Lynch's daughter, filmmaker Jennifer Lynch, denied Anderson's accusations and responded, "I am sorry that Mike is doing this. None of what he says is true, and I hope he receives the help and peace he needs."

Elsewhere on his Facebook page, Anderson made what could be read as anti-Semitic and anti-Islam posts and comments, while also declaring his support for Donald Trump.

Filmography
Television

Film

Video games
Anderson portrayed "Punt" in the PlayStation video game Road Rash: Jailbreak''.

Music appearances
 (1985) "Hell in Paradise," music promo video by Yoko Ono
 (1989) "Turtle Song", music promo video by alternative band Hugo Largo
 (2000) Lodge Anathema (with The Nether-Carols)

References

External links

1953 births
Living people
American male film actors
American male television actors
Male actors from Colorado
Martin Marietta people
People with osteogenesis imperfecta